The First All-Union Philatelic Exhibition was held in Moscow in 1924–1925. Its full name was the First All-Union Philatelic, Scripophilic and Numismatic Exhibition. This was because it combined the objects of philately, scripophily (collecting stock and bond certificates), and numismatics.

The exhibition was organised from 15 December 1924 to 15 February 1925. This was done by the Presidium of the All-Union Philatelic Association and Board of the All-Russian Society of Philatelists. The combined exhibition was meant to prepare formation of the All-Union Society of Collectors. The society was to be under the direction of Feodor Chuchin, the Commissioner for Philately and Scripophily.

See also 
 All-Russian Society of Philatelists
 Leniniana (philately)
 Moscow Society of Philatelists and Collectors
 Organisation of the Commissioner for Philately and Scripophily
 Philatelic International
 Philately
 Soviet Philatelic Association
 Soviet Philatelist

References

Further reading

External links 
 

Philately of the Soviet Union
1924 establishments in the Soviet Union
1925 disestablishments in the Soviet Union
Philatelic events
Exhibitions in Russia
1920s in Moscow